Altrua is a small hamlet, on the south east shore of Loch Lochy, on the A82 road, close to Letterfinlay, Spean Bridge, in  Inverness-shire, Scotland, within the Scottish council area of Highland.

References

External links

 The Highland Council (Comhairle na Gaidhealtachd)
 The Highland council area in the Gazetteer for Scotland website

Geography of Highland (council area)